Saint-Just-d'Ardèche (before 2011: Saint-Just) is a commune in the Ardèche department in southern France.

Geography
Saint-Just-d'Ardèche is the southernmost village of the department, located on the shore of the Rhône River, between the Drôme and the Gard departments.

Population

Transportation
Saint-Just is located along the Route nationale 86.

See also
Communes of the Ardèche department

References

External links
 Saint-Just on the Quid website

Communes of Ardèche
Ardèche communes articles needing translation from French Wikipedia